Optičari (Macedonian Cyrillic: Оптичари) is a village  away from Bitola, which is the second-largest city in North Macedonia.  It used to be part of the former municipality of Bistrica.

Demographics
According to the 1467-68 Ottoman defter, Optičari appears as being largely inhabited by an Orthodox Albanian population. Some families had a mixed Slav-Albanian anthroponomy - usually a Slavic first name and an Albanian last name or last names with Albanian patronyms and Slavic suffixes.

The names of the household heads are: Gjur-ko son of Bard, Siva son of Bard, Sela son of Gjon, Stojk-o Lik-a, Jandra brother of Gjin, Gjin son of Gropo , Gjorgjo-i son of Goja, Gjon-i son of Nikola, Pavli Arbanas (t. Arnaut), Gjergji son of Pavl, Andre-ja son of Koja, Todor son of Koja, Jovan son of Dominik, Simoni son of Vasil, Stojko brother of Gjin, Nikolla son of Dedja, Dedja son of Tush-o, Kosta Ugiçi, Lek-o, Todor- i, Peëtro son of Tush-o, Dimitri son of Tush-o, Andre-ja son of Mano, Siva son of Arbanas (t. Arnaut) Siva son of Marin, Gjurgjo son of Marin.   

According to the 2002 census, the village had a total of 317 inhabitants. Ethnic groups in the village include:

Macedonians 316
Serbs 1

References

Villages in Bitola Municipality